Asplanchnidae is a family of rotifers belonging to the order Ploima.

Genera:
 Asplanchna Gosse, 1850
 Asplanchnopus de Guerne, 1888
 Harringia de Beauchamp, 1912
 Schochapus Varshney, 1985

References

Ploima
Rotifer families